The 2022 Minnesota Twins season  was the 62nd season for the Minnesota Twins franchise in the Twin Cities of Minnesota, their 13th season at Target Field and the 122nd overall in the American League. The team finished third in the American League Central with a 78–84 record.

On December 2, 2021, Commissioner of Baseball Rob Manfred announced a lockout of players, following expiration of the collective bargaining agreement (CBA) between the league and the Major League Baseball Players Association (MLBPA). On March 10, 2022, the MLB and MLBPA agreed to a new collective bargaining agreement, thus ending the lockout. Opening Day was played on April 7. Although MLB previously announced that several series would be cancelled due to the lockout, the agreement provides for a 162-game season, with originally canceled games to be made up via doubleheaders.

After having a 62–55 record, the Twins would collapse. After dropping their lead in their division, they went 16–29 the rest of the way, having another losing season and eliminating them from playoff contention for the second consecutive season.

Offseason

Lockout 

The expiration of the league's collective bargaining agreement (CBA) with the Major League Baseball Players Association occurred on December 1, 2021 with no new agreement in place. As a result, the team owners voted unanimously to lockout the players stopping all free agency and trades. 

The parties came to an agreement on a new CBA on March 10, 2022.

Rule changes 
Pursuant to the new CBA, several new rules were instituted for the 2022 season. The National League will adopt the designated hitter full-time, a draft lottery will be implemented, the postseason will expand from ten teams to twelve, and advertising patches will appear on player uniforms and helmets for the first time.

Roster

Regular season

American League Central

American League Wild Card

Game Log

|- style="background:#fbb;"
| 1 || April 8 || Mariners || 1–2 || Ray (1–0) || Ryan (0–1) || Steckenrider (1) || 35,462 || 0–1 || L1
|- style="background:#fbb;" 
| 2 || April 9 || Mariners || 3–4 || Muñoz (1–0) || Duffey (0–1) || Castillo (1) || 20,867 || 0–2 || L2
|- style="background:#bfb;" 
| 3 || April 10 || Mariners || 10–4 || Ober (1–0) || Gonzales (0–1) || – || 17,018 || 1–2 || W1
|- style="background:#bfb;" 
| 4 || April 11 || Mariners || 4–0 || Bundy (1–0) || Flexen (0–1) || – || 12,932 || 2–2 || W2
|- style="background:#fbb;" 
| 5 || April 12 || Dodgers || 2–7 || Hudson (1–0) || Pagán (0–1) || – || 16,732 || 2–3 || L1
|- style="background:#fbb;" 
| 6 || April 13 || Dodgers || 0–7 || Kershaw (1–0) || Paddack (0–1) || – || 17,101 || 2–4 || L2
|- style="background:#bfb;"
| 7 || April 15 || @ Red Sox || 8–4 || Ryan (1–1) || Pivetta (0–2) || – || 36,266 || 3–4 || W1
|- style="background:#fbb;"
| 8 || April 16 || @ Red Sox || 0–4 || Houck (1–0) || Gray (0–1) || – || 34,990 || 3–5 || L1
|- style="background:#fbb;"
| 9 || April 17 || @ Red Sox || 1–8 || Strahm (1–0) || Ober (1–1) || – || 28,858 || 3–6 || L2
|- style="background:#bfb;"
| 10 || April 18 || @ Red Sox || 8–3 || Bundy (2–0) || Hill (0–1) || – || 32,514 || 4–6 || W1
|- style=background:#fbb;"
| 11 || April 19 || @ Royals || 3–4 || Garrett (1–0) || Duffey (0–2) || Staumont (2) || 10,303 || 4–7 || L1
|- style=background:#fbb;"
| 12 || April 20 || @ Royals || 0–2 || Lynch (1–1) || Paddack (0–2) || Barlow (1) || 8,969 || 4–8 || L2
|- style=background:#bfb;"
| 13 || April 21 || @ Royals || 1–0 || Ryan (2–1) || Greinke (0–1) || Pagán (1) || 15,540 || 5–8 || W1
|- style=background:#bfb;"
| 14 || April 22 || White Sox || 2–1 || Duffey (1–2) || Graveman (0–1) || Pagán (2) || 14,257 || 6–8 || W2
|- style=background:#bfb;"
| 15 || April 23 || White Sox || 9–2 || Bundy (3–0) || Velasquez (0–2) || – || 16,686 || 7–8 || W3
|- style=background:#bfb;"
| 16 || April 24 || White Sox || 6–4  || Smith (1–0) || Hendriks (0–2) || – || 16,197 || 8–8 || W4
|- style=background:#bfb;"
| 17 || April 26 || Tigers || 5–4 || Jax (1–0) || Soto (1–1) || – || 11,803 || 9–8 || W5
|- style=background:#bfb;"
| 18 || April 27 || Tigers || 5–0 || Ryan (3–1) || Pineda (1–1) || – || 11,829 || 10–8 || W6
|- style=background:#bfb;"
| 19 || April 28 || Tigers || 7–1 || Stashak (1–0) || Skubal (1–2) || Jax (1) || 19,365 || 11–8 || W7
|- style=background:#fbb;"
| 20 || April 29 || @ Rays || 1–6 || Kluber (1–1) || Bundy (3–1) || – || 9,928 || 11–9 || L1
|- style=background:#bfb;"
| 21 || April 30 || @ Rays || 9–1 || Stashak (2–0) || McClanahan (1–2) || – || 18,846 || 12–9 || W1
|-

|- style=background:#bfb;"
| 22 || May 1 || @ Rays || 9–3 || Winder (1–0) || Fleming (2–3) || – || 14,830 || 13–9 || W2
|- style=background:#bfb;"
| 23 || May 2 || @ Orioles || 2–1 || Paddack (1–2) || Baker (1–1) || Durán (1) || 7,427 || 14–9 || W3
|- style=background:#bfb;"
| 24 || May 3 || @ Orioles || 7–2 || Thielbar (1–0) || Krehbiel (1–3) || – || 6,678 || 15–9 || W4
|- style=background:#fbb;"
| 25 || May 4 || @ Orioles || 4–9 || Pérez (1–0) || Bundy (3–2) || – || 7,466 || 15–10 || L1
|- style=background:#fbb;"
| 26 || May 5 || @ Orioles || 3–5 || López (3–1) || Durán (0–1) || – || 8,652 || 15–11 || L2
|- style=background:#bfb;"
| 27 || May 6 || Athletics || 2–1 || Winder (2–0) || Logue (1–1) || Pagán (3) || 17,509 || 16–11 || W1
|- style=background:#bfb;"
| 28 || May 7 || Athletics || 1–0 || Jax (2–0) || Kaprielian (0–2) || Durán (2) || 22,272 || 17–11 || W2
|- style=background:#bfb;"
| 29 || May 8 || Athletics || 4–3 || Stashak (3–0) || Jefferies (1–5) || Pagán (4) || 14,295 || 18–11 || W3
|- style=background:#fbb;"
| 30 || May 10 || Astros || 0–5 || Verlander (4–1) || Ryan (3–2) || – || 16,156 || 18–12 || L1
|- style=background:#bbb;" 
| — || May 11 || Astros || colspan=7| SUSP., RAIN; resuming May 12
|- style=background:#fbb;"
| 31 || May 12  || Astros || 3–11 || Abreu (2–0) || Archer (0–1) || – ||  || 18–13 || L2
|- style=background:#fbb;"
| 32 || May 12  || Astros || 0–5 || García (3–1) || Winder (2–1) || – || 16,918 || 18–14 || L3
|- style=background:#bfb;"
| 33 || May 13 || Guardians || 12–8 || Jax (3–0) || Civale (1–3) || – || 18,711 || 19–14 || W1
|- style=background:#fbb;"
| 34 || May 14 || Guardians || 2–3  || Sandlin (3–1) || Cotton (0–1) || Clase (7) || 22,939 || 19–15 || L1
|- style=background:#bfb;"
| 35 || May 15 || Guardians || 3–1 || Ryan (4–2) || McKenzie (2–3) || Pagán (5) || 19,850 || 20–15 || W1
|- style=background:#bfb;"
| 36 || May 16 || @ Athletics || 3–1 || Cano (1–0) || Logue (2–2) || Duffey (1) || 3,138 || 21–15 || W2
|- style=background:#fbb;"
| 37 || May 17 || @ Athletics || 2–5 || Jackson (1–1) || Winder (2–2) || Jiménez (7) || 3,640 || 21–16 || L1
|- style=background:#bfb;"
| 38 || May 18 || @ Athletics || 14–4 || Gray (1–1) || Jefferies (1–7) || – || 7,106 || 22–16 || W1
|- style=background:#bfb;"
| 39 || May 20 || @ Royals || 6–4 || Smeltzer (1–0) || Lynch (2–3) || Pagán (6) || 25,337 || 23–16 || W2
|- style=background:#bfb;"
| 40 || May 21 || @ Royals || 9–2 || Ryan (5–2) || Keller (1–4) || – || 17,893 || 24–16 || W3
|- style=background:#bfb;"
| 41 || May 22 || @ Royals || 7–6 || Duffey (2–2) || Staumont (1–1) || Durán (3) || 15,482 || 25–16 || W4
|- style=background:#bfb;"
| 42 || May 23 || Tigers || 5–4 || Pagán (1–1) || Chafin (0–1) || – || 16,361 || 26–16 || W5
|- style=background:#bfb;"
| 43 || May 24 || Tigers || 2–0 || Gray (2–1) || Brieske (0–4) || Durán (4) || 17,882 || 27–16 || W6
|- style=background:#fbb;"
| 44 || May 25 || Tigers || 2–4  || Lange (1–1) || Megill (0–1) || Chafin (1) || 20,375 || 27–17 || L1
|- style=background:#fbb;"
| 45 || May 26 || Royals || 2–3 || Staumont (2–1) || Duffey (2–3) || Barlow (5) || 17,657 || 27–18 || L2
|- style=background:#bfb;"
| 46 || May 27 || Royals || 10–7 || Megill (1–1) || Keller (1–5) || Pagán (7) || 21,841 || 28–18 || W1
|- style=background:#fbb;"
| 47 || May 28 || Royals || 3–7 || Singer (2–0) || Archer (0–2) || – || 22,249 || 28–19 || L1
|- style=background:#bfb;"
| 48 || May 29 || Royals || 7–3 || Gray (3–1) || Greinke (0–4) || – || 27,195 || 29–19 || W1
|- style=background:#fbb;"
| 49 || May 30 || @ Tigers || 5–7 || Jiménez (2–0) || Smith (1–1) || Soto (9) || 15,191 || 29–20 || L1
|- style=background:#bfb;"
| 50 || May 31  || @ Tigers || 8–2 || Smeltzer (2–0) || García (0–1) || – || 11,756 || 30–20 || W1
|- style=background:#fbb;"
| 51 || May 31  || @ Tigers || 0–4 || Peralta (2–0) || Sands (0–1) || – || 12,122 || 30–21 || L1
|-

|- style=background:#fbb;"
| 52 || June 1 || @ Tigers || 0–5 || Skubal (4–2) || Ober (1–2) || – || 13,211 || 30–22 || L2
|- style=background:#fbb;"
| 53 || June 2 || @ Tigers || 2–3 || Lange (3–1) || Pagán (1–2) || Soto (10) || 17,972 || 30–23 || L3
|- style=background:#bfb;"
| 54 || June 3 || @ Blue Jays || 9–3 || Cotton (1–1) || Kikuchi (2–2) || – || 27,753 || 31–23 || W1
|- style=background:#fbb;"
| 55 || June 4 || @ Blue Jays || 3–12 || Berríos (4–2) || Bundy (3–3) || – || 36,987 || 31–24 || L1
|- style=background:#bfb;"
| 56 || June 5 || @ Blue Jays || 8–6 || Cotton (2–1) || Gausman (5–4) || Morán (1) || 34,088 || 32–24 || W1
|- style=background:#fbb;"
| 57 || June 7 || Yankees || 4–10 || Luetge (2–2) || Sands (0–2) || – || 27,643 || 32–25 || L1
|- style=background:#bfb;"
| 58 || June 8 || Yankees || 8–1 || Archer (1–2) || Cortés Jr (5–2) || – || 22,286 || 33–25 || W1
|- style=background:#fbb;"
| 59 || June 9 || Yankees || 7–10 || Castro (3–0) || Durán (0–2) || Holmes (9) || 26,646 || 33–26 || L1
|- style=background:#bfb;"
| 60 || June 10 || Rays || 9–4 || Smeltzer (3–0) || Rasmussen (5–3) || – || 23,761 || 34–26 || W1
|- style=background:#bfb;"
| 61 || June 11 || Rays || 6–5 || Megill (2–1) || Baz (0–1) || Pagán (8) || 22,741 || 35–26 || W2
|- style=background:#fbb;"
| 62 || June 12 || Rays || 0–6 || Springs (3–2) || Sands (0–3) || – || 25,350 || 35–27 || L1
|- style=background:#bfb;"
| 63 || June 13 || @ Mariners || 3–2 || Thielbar (2–0) || Flexen (2–8) || Pagán (9) || 12,749 || 36–27 || W1
|- style=background:#fbb;"
| 64 || June 14 || @ Mariners || 0–5 || Gilbert (7–2) || Ryan (5–3) || – || 13,019 || 36–28 || L1
|- style=background:#bfb;"
| 65 || June 15 || @ Mariners || 5–0 || Jax (4–0) || Gonzales (3–7) || – || 15,329 || 37–28 || W1
|- style=background:#fbb;"
| 66 || June 17 || @ Diamondbacks || 2–7 || Bumgarner (3–6) || Smeltzer (3–1) || – || 26,351 || 37–29 || L1
|- style=background:#bfb;"
| 67 || June 18 || @ Diamondbacks || 11–1 || Bundy (4–3) || Weaver (1–1) || – || 24,338 || 38–29 || W1
|- style=background:#fbb;"
| 68 || June 19 || @ Diamondbacks || 1–7 || Kelly (6–4) || Archer (1–3) || – || 30,690 || 38–30 || L1
|- style=background:#fbb;"
| 69 || June 21 || Guardians || 5–6  || Stephan (3–2) || Jax (4–1) || Clase (16) || 22,341 || 38–31 || L2
|- style=background:#fbb;"
| 70 || June 22 || Guardians || 10–11 || Hentges (1–0) || Jax (4–2) || Clase (17) || 25,604 || 38–32 || L3
|- style=background:#bfb;"
| 71 || June 23 || Guardians || 1–0 || Smeltzer (4–1) || Plesac (2–5) || Thielbar (1) || 24,989 || 39–32 || W1
|- style=background:#fbb;"
| 72 || June 24 || Rockies || 0–1 || Márquez (4–5) || Bundy (4–4) || Bard (15) || 24,463 || 39–33 || L1
|- style=background:#bfb;"
| 73 || June 25 || Rockies || 6–0 || Archer (2–3) || Senzatela (3–4) || – || 24,578 || 40–33 || W1
|- style=background:#bfb;"
| 74 || June 26 || Rockies || 6–3 || Ryan (6–3) || Feltner (1–3) || Durán (5) || 28,048 || 41–33 || W2
|- style=background:#bfb;"
| 75 || June 27 || @ Guardians || 11–1 || Gray (4–1) || McKenzie (4–6) || — || 12,554 || 42–33 || W3
|- style=background:#fbb;"
| 76 || June 28  || @ Guardians || 2–3 || Hentges (2–0) || Pagán (1–3) || Clase (18) || 12,442 || 42–34 || L1
|- style=background:#bfb;"
| 77 || June 28  || @ Guardians || 6–0 || Winder (3–2) || Pilkington (1–1) || – || 12,145 || 43–34 || W1
|- style=background:#fbb;"
| 78 || June 29 || @ Guardians || 6–7  || Morgan (4–2) || Cotton (2–2) || – || 12,840 || 43–35 || L1
|- style=background:#fbb;"
| 79 || June 30 || @ Guardians || 3–5 || Clase (2–2) || Thornburg (0–1) || – || 17,066 || 43–36 || L2
|-

|- style=background:#bfb;"
| 80 || July 1 || Orioles || 3–2 || Minaya (1–0) || López (3–4) || – || 25,540 || 44–36 || W1
|- style=background:#bfb;"
| 81 || July 2 || Orioles || 4–3 || Pagán (2–3) || López (3–5) || – || 20,618 || 45–36 || W2
|- style=background:#fbb;"
| 82 || July 3 || Orioles || 1–3 || Wells (7–4) || Smeltzer (4–2) || Tate (2) || 24,424 || 45–37 || L1
|- style=background:#bfb;"
| 83 || July 4 || @ White Sox || 6–3  || Pagán (3–3) || Kelly (0–2) || – || 32,483 || 46–37 || W1
|- style=background:#bfb;"
| 84 || July 5 || @ White Sox || 8–2 || Winder (4–2) || Kopech (2–6) || – || 18,566 || 47–37 || W2
|- style=background:#fbb;"
| 85 || July 6 || @ White Sox || 8–9  || Ruiz (1–0) || Morán (0–1) || – || 18,393 || 47–38 || L1
|- style=background:#fbb;"
| 86 || July 8 || @ Rangers || 5–6 || Gray (5–4) || Gray (4–2) || Martin (1) || 30,392 || 47–39 || L2
|- style=background:#fbb;"
| 87 || July 9 || @ Rangers || 7–9 || Moore (4–2) || Durán (0–3) || Martin (2) || 35,427 || 47–40 || L3
|- style=background:#bfb;"
| 88 || July 10 || @ Rangers || 6–5 || Bundy (5–4) || Burke (4–2) || Duffey (2) || 24,751 || 48–40 || W1
|- style=background:#fbb;"
| 89 || July 12 || Brewers || 3–6 || Gustave (2–0) || Winder (4–3) || Hader (27) || 37,183 || 48–41 || L1
|- style=background:#bfb;"
| 90 || July 13 || Brewers || 4–1 || Durán (1–3) || Hader (0–3) || – || 38,802 || 49–41 || W1
|- style=background:#fbb;"
| 91 || July 14 || White Sox || 2–12 || Cueto (4–4) || Gray (4–3) || – || 26,907 || 49–42 || L1
|- style=background:#fbb;"
| 92 || July 15 || White Sox || 2–6 || Kopech (3–6) || Pagán (3–4) || – || 27,021 || 49–43 || L2
|- style=background:#bfb;"
| 93 || July 16 || White Sox || 6–3 || Bundy (6–4) || Lynn (1–3) || Durán (6) || 28,514 || 50–43 || W1
|- style=background:#fbb;"
| 94 || July 17 || White Sox || 0–11 || Cease (9–4) || Archer (2–4) || – || 23,225 || 50–44 || L1
|- style=background:#bcf
| ASG || July 19 || AL @ NL || 3–2 || Valdez (1–0) || Gonsolin (0–1) || Clase (1) || 52,518 || N/A || N/A
|- style=background:#bfb;"
| 95 || July 23 || @ Tigers || 8–4 || Ryan (7–3) || Pineda (2–6) || – || 34,205 || 51–44 || W1
|- style=background:#bfb;"
| 96 || July 24 || @ Tigers || 9–1 || Gray (5–3) || García (3–3) || – || 23,570 || 52–44 || W2
|- style=background:#fbb;"
| 97 || July 26 || @ Brewers || 6–7 || Hader (1–4) || Duffey (2–4) || – || 28,596 || 52–45 || L1
|- style=background:#fbb;"
| 98 || July 27 || @ Brewers || 4–10 || Burnes (8–4) || Archer (2–5) || – || 35,914 || 52–46 || L2
|- style=background:#fbb;"
| 99 || July 29 || @ Padres || 1–10 || Snell (3–5) || Ryan (7–4) || – || 43,171 || 52–47 || L3
|- style=background:#bfb;"
| 100 || July 30 || @ Padres || 7–4 || Gray (6–3) || Musgrove (8–4) || – || 39,574 || 53–47 || W1
|- style=background:#fbb;"
| 101 || July 31 || @ Padres || 2–3 || Manaea (6–5) || Bundy (6–5) || García (1) || 37,336 || 53–48 || L1
|-

|- style=background:#bfb;"
| 102 || August 1 || Tigers || 5–3  || Jax (5–2) || Lange (4–2) || – || 20,231 || 54–48 || W1
|- style=background:#fbb;"
| 103 || August 2 || Tigers || 3–5 || Foley (1–0) || Jax (5–3) || Soto (20) || 23,394 || 54–49 || L1
|- style=background:#bfb;"
| 104 || August 3 || Tigers || 4–1 || Ryan (8–4) || Alexander (2–5) || López (20) || 25,044 || 55–49 || W1
|- style=background:#fbb;"
| 105 || August 4 || Blue Jays || 3–9 || Manoah (12–5) || Pagán (3–5) || – || 39,030 || 55–50 || L1
|- style=background:#bfb;"
| 106 || August 5 || Blue Jays || 6–5  || Fulmer (4–4) || Romano (3–3) || – || 29,593 || 56–50 || W1
|- style=background:#bfb;"
| 107 || August 6 || Blue Jays || 7–3 || Megill (3–1) || White (1–3) || – || 27,471 || 57–50 || W2
|- style=background:#fbb;"
| 108 || August 7 || Blue Jays || 2–3  || Romano (4–3) || Thielbar (2–1) || – || 26,155 || 57–51 || L1
|- style=background:#fbb;"
| 109 || August 9 || @ Dodgers || 3–10 || Urías (12–6) || Ryan (8–5) || – || 47,874 || 57–52 || L2
|- style=background:#fbb;"
| 110 || August 10 || @ Dodgers || 5–8 || Price (1–0) || Fulmer (4–5) || – || 53,432 || 57–53 || L3
|- style=background:#bfb;"
| 111 || August 12 || @ Angels || 4–0 || Mahle (6–7) || Sandoval (3–8) || – || 33,459 || 58–53 || W1
|- style=background:#fbb;"
| 112 || August 13 || @ Angels || 3–5  || Tepera (2–2) || Pagán (3–6) || – || 43,027 || 58–54 || L1
|- style=background:#fbb;"
| 113 || August 14 || @ Angels || 2–4 || Davidson (2–3) || Archer (2–6) || Quijada (3) || 27,515 || 58–55 || L2
|- style=background:#bfb;"
| 114 || August 15 || Royals || 4–2 || Ryan (9–5) || Bubic (2–7) || López (21) || 22,003 || 59–55 || W1
|- style=background:#bfb;"
| 115 || August 16 || Royals || 9–0 || Gray (7–3) || Greinke (4–8) || – || 23,093 || 60–55 || W2
|- style=background:#bfb;"
| 116 || August 17 || Royals || 4–0 || Pagán (4–6) || Lynch (4–8) || – || 23,543 || 61–55 || W3
|- style=background:#bfb;"
| 117 || August 19 || Rangers || 2–1 || Bundy (7–5) || Pérez (9–4) || López (22) || 22,627 || 62–55 || W4
|- style=background:#fbb;"
| 118 || August 20 || Rangers || 3–4  || Hernández (1–0) || Thielbar (2–2) || – || 21,781 || 62–56 || L1
|- style=background:#fbb;"
| 119 || August 21 || Rangers || 0–7 || Arihara (1–1) || Ryan (9–6) || Hearn (1) || 24,802 || 62–57 || L2
|- style=background:#fbb;"
| 120 || August 22 || Rangers || 1–2 || Alexy (1–0) || Gray (7–4) || Moore (3) || 18,595 || 62–58 || L3
|- style=background:#fbb;"
| 121 || August 23 || @ Astros || 2–4 || Verlander (16–3) || Sanchez (3–4) || Abreu (2) || 32,639 || 62–59 || L4
|- style=background:#fbb;"
| 122 || August 24 || @ Astros || 3–5 || Valdez (13–4) || Bundy (7–6) || – || 27,070 || 62–60 || L5
|- style=background:#fbb;"
| 123 || August 25 || @ Astros || 3–6 || García (11–8) || Archer (2–7) || Montero (8) || 33,320 || 62–61 || L6
|- style=background:#bfb;"
| 124 || August 26 || Giants || 9–0 || Ryan (10–6) || Wood (8–11) || – || 25,246 || 63–61 || W1
|- style=background:#bfb;"
| 125 || August 27 || Giants || 3–2  || Durán (2–3) || Leone (4–5) || – || 27,570 || 64–61 || W2
|- style=background:#bfb;"
| 126 || August 28 || Giants || 8–3 || Smeltzer (5–2) || Junis (4–4) || – || 25,285 || 65–61 || W3
|- style=background:#bfb;"
| 127 || August 29 || Red Sox || 4–2 || Thielbar (3–2) || Bello (0–4) || López (23) || 19,581 || 66–61 || W4
|- style=background:#bfb;"
| 128 || August 30 || Red Sox || 10–5 || Fulmer (5–5) || Crawford (3–6) || – || 19,909 || 67–61 || W5
|- style=background:#fbb;"
| 129 || August 31 || Red Sox || 5–6 || Wacha (10–1) || Ryan (10–7) || Barnes (4) || 19,337 || 67–62 || L1
|-

|- style=background:#fbb;"
| 130 || September 2 || @ White Sox || 3–4 || Hendriks (3–3) || López (4–7) || – || 24,818 || 67–63 || L2
|- style=background:#fbb;"
| 131 || September 3 || @ White Sox || 0–13 || Cease (13–6) || Mahle (6–8) || – || 31,655 || 67–64 || L3
|- style=background:#bfb;"
| 132 || September 4 || @ White Sox || 5–1 || Bundy (8–6) || Giolito (10–9) || – || 32,305 || 68–64 || W1
|- style=background:#fbb;"
| 133 || September 5 || @ Yankees || 2–5 || Weissert (2–0) || Megill (3–2) || Holmes (19) || 38,446 || 68–65 || L1
|- style=background:#bbb;" 
| — || September 6 || @ Yankees || colspan=7| PPD, RAIN; rescheduled for Sept 7
|- style=background:#fbb;"
| 134 || September 7  || @ Yankees || 4–5  || Weissert (3−0) || Megill (3−3) || – ||  || 68–66 || L2
|- style=background:#fbb;"
| 135 || September 7  || @ Yankees || 1–7 || Cole (11−7) || Ryan (10−8) || Luetge (2) || 30,157 || 68–67 || L3
|- style=background:#bfb;"
| 136 || September 8 || @ Yankees || 4–3 || Jax (6−3) || Peralta (2−4) || Fulmer (3) || 35,551 || 69–67 || W1
|- style=background:#fbb;"
| 137 || September 9 || Guardians || 6–7 || Quantrill (12–5) || Bundy (8–7) || Clase (32) || 18,595 || 69–68 || L1
|- style=background:#fbb;"
| 138 || September 10 || Guardians || 4–6 || McKenzie (10–11) || Archer (2–8) || Clase (33) || 26,073 || 69–69 || L2
|- style=background:#fbb;"
| 139 || September 11 || Guardians || 1–4 || Bieber (10–8) || Winder (4–4) || Karinchak (2) || 19,016 || 69–70 || L3
|- style=background:#bfb;"
| 140 || September 13 || Royals || 6–3 || Ryan (11–8) || Bubic (2–12) || – || 19,005 || 70–70 || W1
|- style=background:#bfb;"
| 141 || September 14 || Royals || 4–0 || Gray (8–4) || Greinke (4–9) || – || 14,927 || 71–70 || W2
|- style=background:#bfb;"
| 142 || September 15 || Royals || 3–2 || Megill (4–3) || Lynch (4–11) || Durán (7) || 16,595 || 72–70 || W3
|- style=background:#fbb;"
| 143 || September 16 || @ Guardians || 3–4 || Stephan (6–4) || Durán (2–4) || Clase (36) || 20,669 || 72–71 || L1
|- style=background:#fbb;"
| 144 || September 17  || @ Guardians || 1–5 || Bieber (11−8) || Varland (0−1) || – || 18,177 || 72–72 || L2
|- style=background:#fbb;"
| 145 || September 17  || @ Guardians || 6–7  || McCarty (4–2) || Rodríguez (0–1) || – || 24,449 || 72–73 || L3
|- style=background:#bfb;"
| 146 || September 18 || @ Guardians || 3–0 || Ryan (12–8) || Morris (0–2) || Durán (8) || 19,601 || 73–73 || W1
|- style=background:#fbb;"
| 147 || September 19 || @ Guardians || 4–11 || Quantrill (13–5) || Gray (8–5) || Hentges (1) || 12,168 || 73–74 || L1
|- style=background:#fbb;"
| 148 || September 20 || @ Royals || 4–5 || Coleman (5–2) || Fulmer (5–6) || Barlow (22) || 14,508 || 73–75 || L2
|- style=background:#fbb;"
| 149 || September 21 || @ Royals || 2–5 || Misiewicz (1–1) || Ober (1–3) || Barlow (23) || 13,952 || 73–76 || L3
|- style=background:#fbb;"
| 150 || September 22 || @ Royals || 1–4 || Heasley (4–8) || Winder (4–5) || Keller (1) || 12,951 || 73–77 || L4
|- style=background:#fbb;"
| 151 || September 23 || Angels || 2–4 || Ohtani (14–8) || Varland (0–2) || Tepera (4) || 24,896 || 73–78 || L5
|- style=background:#bfb;"
| 152 || September 24 || Angels || 8–4 || Jax (7–3) || Detmers (6–6) || – || 30,959 || 74–78 || W1
|- style=background:#fbb;"
| 153 || September 25 || Angels || 3–10 || Suárez (7–8) || Bundy (8–8) || – || 24,133 || 74–79 || L1
|- style=background:#bfb;"
| 154 || September 27 || White Sox || 4–0 || Ober (2–3) || Lynn (7–7) || – || 23,647 || 75–79 || W1
|- style=background:#bfb;"
| 155 || September 28 || White Sox || 8–4 || Thielbar (4–2) || Cueto (7–10) || – || 22,332 || 76–79 || W2
|- style=background:#fbb;"
| 156 || September 29 || White Sox || 3–4 || López (6–4) || Thielbar (4–3) || Hendriks (34) || 23,397 || 76–80 || L1
|- style=background:#bfb;"
| 157 || September 30 || @ Tigers || 7–0 || Ryan (13–8) || Alexander (4–11) || – || 18,505 || 77–80 || W1
|-

|- style=background:#fbb;"
| 158 || October 1 || @ Tigers || 2–3 || Norris (2–4) || Henríquez (0–1) || Chafin (2) || 18,307 || 77–81 || L1
|- style=background:#fbb;"
| 159 || October 2 || @ Tigers || 2–5 || Lange (7–4) || Woods-Richardson (0–1) || Soto (30) || 20,105 || 77–82 || L2
|- style="background:#fbb;" 
| 160 || October 3 || @ White Sox || 2–3 || Cueto (8–10) || Jax (7–4) || Hendriks (37) || 22,891 || 77–83 || L3
|- style="background:#fbb;" 
| 161 || October 4 || @ White Sox || 3–8 || Giolito (11–9) || Winder (4–6) || – || 24,884 || 77–84 || L4
|- style="background:#bfb;"
| 162 || October 5 || @ White Sox || 10–1 || Varland (1–2) || Martin (3–5) || Sands (1) || 18,918 || 78–84 || W1

Statistics

Batting 
(through October 5, 2022)
Players in bold are on the active roster.
Note: G = Games played; AB = At bats; R = Runs; H = Hits; 2B = Doubles; 3B = Triples; HR = Home runs; RBI = Runs batted in; SB = Stolen bases; BB = Walks; K = Strikeouts; AVG = Batting average; OBP = On Base Percentage; SLG = Slugging Percentage; TB = Total Bases

Source

Pitching 
(through October 5, 2022)
Players in bold are on the active roster.
Note: W = Wins; L = Losses; ERA = Earned run average; WHIP = Walks plus hits per inning pitched; G = Games pitched; GS = Games started; SV = Saves; IP = Innings pitched; H = Hits allowed; R = Runs allowed; ER = Earned runs allowed; BB = Walks allowed; K = Strikeouts

Source

Farm system

References

External links
2022 Minnesota Twins season at Baseball Reference

2022
2022 Major League Baseball season
2022 in sports in Minnesota